Marko Boltić (born 6 October 1987) is a Serbian professional basketball player who last played for OKK Beograd of the Basketball League of Serbia.

External links
 Player profile at eurobasket.com
 Player profile at realgm.com

1987 births
Living people
Basketball League of Serbia players
KK Mladost Zemun players
KK Vojvodina Srbijagas players
BKK Radnički players
OKK Beograd players
Serbian expatriate basketball people in Hungary
Serbian expatriate basketball people in North Macedonia
Serbian expatriate basketball people in Romania
Serbian expatriate basketball people in Slovenia
Serbian expatriate basketball people in Switzerland
Serbian men's basketball players
Basketball players from Belgrade
Shooting guards
SZTE-Szedeák players
Vevey Riviera Basket players